Harpalus wohlberedti is a species of ground beetle in the subfamily Harpalinae. It was described by Emden & Schauberger in 1932. According to a study in 2012, it is most commonly found in Holm Oak forests.

References

wohlberedti
Beetles described in 1932